The Hunchback is an 1832 comedy play by the Irish writer James Sheridan Knowles. Knowles wrote it in the wake of the disastrous reception of his previous comedy The Beggar's Daughter of Bethnal Green in 1828. It premiered at the Theatre Royal, Covent Garden in London's West End on 5 April 1832. The cast included Sheridan Knowles himself as Master Walter, Fanny Kemble as Julia, Hariette Taylor as Helen, Charles Kemble as Sir Thomas Clifford, Benjamin Wrench as Lord Tinsel, William Abbot as Modus, Drinkwater Meadows as Fathom and William Payne as Stephen. It was Fanny Kemble's last performance in England before embarking on a tour of the United States with her father, where she married and retired from the stage.

References

Bibliography
 Nicoll, Allardyce. A History of Early Nineteenth Century Drama 1800-1850. Cambridge University Press, 1930.

1832 plays
West End plays
Comedy plays
British plays
Plays by James Sheridan Knowles